WDEF-FM (92.3 MHz "Sunny 92.3") is a commercial radio station in Chattanooga, Tennessee. The station is owned by Bahakel Communications and airs an adult contemporary radio format.  WDEF-FM advertises itself as the "listening at work" station.  For much of November and December, the station switches to all-Christmas music.

WDEF-FM has an effective radiated power (ERP) of 100,000 watts.  It can be heard around Southeast Tennessee, Northwest Georgia and Northeast Alabama.  The transmitter is on Hampton Road in Signal Mountain, Tennessee, co-located with the tower for former sister station WDEF-TV Channel 12.  Its studios are located on Broad Street in Chattanooga.

History
WDEF-FM signed on the air on September 15, 1964.  It was owned by Roy H. Park.  At first it simulcast co-owned AM 1370 WDEF (now WXCT).

Park installed beautiful music formats on most of his FM stations, and WDEF-FM played instrumental cover versions of popular songs, as well as Broadway and Hollywood show tunes.  But as the 1980s ended, the format was seeing its audience age, while most advertisers seek young and middle aged listeners.

In the early 1990s, WDEF-FM made the transition from easy listening music to soft adult contemporary.  Over time, WDEF-FM shifted to mainstream AC music.

Noted morning drive time disc jockey Luther Masingill was the WDEF-AM-FM morning host from December 31, 1940 until his death in 2014. He was on the air longer than any other host in U.S. radio history. He began working at WDEF and moved to WDEF-FM when the AM switched to a sports format. In 2012, Masingill was one of the first inductees into the new Tennessee Radio Hall of Fame. On November 12, 2012, Massingill was one of several radio personalities inducted into the national Radio Hall of Fame at a ceremony at the Chicago Museum of Broadcast Communications.

References

External links

Bahakel Communications
DEF-FM
DEF-FM
Mainstream adult contemporary radio stations in the United States
Radio stations established in 1964
1964 establishments in Tennessee